Jean Elysée Puiforcat (pronounced pwee-for-KAH) (5 August 1897 – 20 October 1945) was a French silversmith, sculptor and designer. Miller's Antiques Encyclopedia calls Puiforcat the "most important French Art Deco silversmith."

Life and career

Puiforcat served in World War I. After the war, he apprenticed as a silversmith and a designer. He lived in Paris. He designed in the art deco style. His silver work had smooth surfaces and was based on the geometric series. Ivory, onyx, lapis lazuli, and rosewood were used to decorate pieces. He also used gilding. Puiforcat left Paris and moved to Saint-Jean-de-Luz, around 1927. He worked briefly in Havana, Cuba from 1928 thru 1930. French painter and sculptor Henri Charlier who was born in the Montmartre quarter of Paris in 1883 was a good friend of Puiforcat. Henry and Puiforcat exchanged many letters which his daughter Alizabeth Charlier kept along with photos of a trip that her father Henri made to Havana. The photos were at the shop where Puiforcat and a cuban sculptor by the name of Juan Comas were sculpting lions to be cast in bronze for an important Havana Avenue. Puiforcat, Henri and Comas became acquainted during his stay in Havana. From one of his letters from Cuba, he wrote about how little credit had been given to the Cuban sculptor, only because he (Puiforcat) was famous. He seemed to admire Juan Comas' talent very much. Henri and Puiforcat kept the friendship and even met in Mexico around 1943. Puiforcat co-founded the Union des Artistes Modernes. He started designing tableware and by 1934 he also had designed liturgical silver. In 1941, he moved to Mexico. After his move, he started exhibiting in the United States. Puiforcat's name is synonymous with Art Deco glamour; even in his day, the important French silversmith was renowned for the elegant, often mathematical simplicity of his geometric forms and the unexpected combination of flawless metalwork with precious woods, brilliantly polished hardstones, semiprecious stones, or glass.

Legacy

Andy Warhol collected Puiforcat silverware, which he acquired while visiting Paris in the 1970s. In 1988, Warhol memorabilia was sold at Sotheby's. The collection sold for $451,000 and a tureen with an aventurine decoration sold for $55,000. Work by Puiforcat is held in the collection of the Cooper-Hewitt, National Design Museum and the Victoria & Albert Museum. A chain of boutiques is named after him, which sell his designs and sculptures.

References

1897 births
1945 deaths
French silversmiths
French industrial designers
Art Deco designers
Metalsmiths from Paris
French military personnel of World War I